Saloğlu (also, Saloghly and Salogly) is a village and municipality in the Agstafa Rayon of Azerbaijan.  It has a population of 1,581.  The municipality consists of the villages of Saloğlu and Ceyrançöl.

References 

Populated places in Aghstafa District